Actinomyxa is a genus of fungi in the Microthyriaceae family. This is a monotypic genus, containing the single species Actinomyxa australiensis .

References

External links
 Index Fungorum

Microthyriales
Monotypic Dothideomycetes genera